The St. Paul Missionary Baptist Church in Boise, Idaho is a historic Baptist church founded in 1909, and its building at 124 Broadway Avenue which was built in 1921.  The building was added to the National Register of Historic Places in 1982.

In 1982 it was deemed "historically significant as one of two churches still in existence in Idaho with a predominantly black congregation", when the congregation was about 150.  The church was built by church members, including William Riley Hardy, its first pastor.  It is described as "a vernacular structure with bungalow elements."

References

Baptist churches in Idaho
Churches on the National Register of Historic Places in Idaho
Churches completed in 1921
Churches in Boise, Idaho
National Register of Historic Places in Boise, Idaho